Pietro "Pete" Panto (September 13, 1910 – July 14, 1939) was an Italian American longshoreman and union activist who was murdered by the mob for attempting to revolt against union leadership. Panto was born in Brooklyn and at an unknown date he left the United States, returning on June 3, 1924, on the  that sailed out of Naples. He left the United States again, returning on March 22, 1934, on the  that sailed out of Palermo. Both ship registries list 198 Sackett Street in Brooklyn as his address.

Revolt
Pietro "Pete" Panto was the leader of a revolt against Joseph P. Ryan and his colleagues, many of them allegedly mafia, who ran the International Longshoremen's Association (ILA). Corruption was rampant among ILA leaders and working conditions were deplorable. Panto attempted to expose this corruption via the Brooklyn Rank-and-File Committee, a group of "left wing" dockworkers. He and the Rank-And-File Committee held open air assemblies attracting over 1500 longshoreman at a time. This was a serious threat to Ryan, Anastasia, and other corrupt officials. Panto was lured from his home on July 14, 1939, following a phone call from an unknown individual and was never seen again. His body was later found during January 1941, in a lime pit in Lyndhurst, New Jersey. Albert Anastasia was suspected of ordering the execution but Abe Reles, the chief witness, died in 1941 while supposedly trying to escape from custody. He either "jumped or fell" from a room where he was held under guard by six police officers.

Panto's murder was allegedly carried out by Mendy Weiss, Tony Romanello and James Ferraco of Murder, Inc. Although Anastasia, Weiss, Romanello and Ferraco were never indicted, Weiss would receive the electric chair in 1944 for a separate murder, whereas Anastasia was murdered by rival mobsters in 1957. Romanello was arrested and questioned in 1942. A few months after his release from custody his dead body was found along the banks of the Brandywine Creek near Wilmington, Delaware. James Ferraco had vanished without a trace and was most likely killed in 1940 or 1941. Ryan resigned in 1953, following New York State Industrial Commissioner Edward Corsi and Governor Thomas E. Dewey's investigation into corruption charges.

Cultural references
The Hook, an unproduced screenplay by Arthur Miller, portrays Panto's "doomed attempt to overthrow the feudal gangsterism of the New York docks".

See also
List of solved missing person cases
List of unsolved murders
On the Waterfront

References

External links
True Life Tales on the Waterfront
Waterfront Documentary Tells Story Vividly
Nine Hundred & Forty Thieves at Time Magazine
Chi è Pete Panto? 
 Where's Pete Panto? by Helene Stapinski, New York Times, July 9, 2022

1910 births
1930s missing person cases
1939 deaths
American people of Italian descent
Assassinated American activists
International Longshoremen's Association people
Missing person cases in New Jersey
People murdered by Murder, Inc.
Unsolved murders in the United States
Trade unionists from New York (state)